Bidiyo (also known as Bidyo, Bidio, 'Bidio, 'Bidiyo, Bidiyo-Waana, Bidiya) is an Afro-Asiatic language spoken in south central Chad.

Notes

References
 Alio, Khalil .  1986.  Essai de description de la langue bidiya du Guéra (Tchad).  Berlin:  Reimer.
 Alio (Aliyo Daouchane), Khalil. 1987a. Les classes verbales en bidiya. In: Herrmann Jungraithmayr and Henry Tourneux (eds.), Etudes tchadiques, Classes et extensions verbales, 11–16. Paris: Geuthner.
 Alio (Aliyo Daouchane), Khalil. 1987b. Extensions figées et productives en bidiya. In: Herrmann Jungraithmayr and Henry Tourneux (eds.), Etudes tchadiques, Classes et extensions verbales, 43–48. Paris: Geuthner.
 Alio, Khalil. 1988a. Emprunts et intégration en bidiya. In: Daniel Barreteau and Henry Tourneux (eds.), Le milieu et les hommes: recherches comparative et historiques dans le bassin du lac Tchad. Actes du 2ème colloque Méga-Tchad, 265–273. Paris: ORSTOM.
 Alio, Khalil. 1988b. La conjugaison du bidiya (langue tchadique du Guéra, Tchad) et l'intégration des emprunts verbaux au français et à l'arabe. Cahiers du LACITO 3:81–93.
 Alio, Khalil. 1988c. Transitivité et conjugaison à suffixes en bidiya. In: Herrmann Jungraithmayr and Henry Tourneux (eds.), Études tchadiques: transitivité et diathèse, 21–32. Paris : Librairie Orientaliste Paul Geuthner pour la Laboratoire de Langues et Civilisations à Tradition Orale (LACITO).
 Alio, Khalil. 2004. Sússúnà. Contes bidiya (Guéra, Tchad). Westafrikanische Studien, 30. Cologne: Rüdiger Köppe.
 Alio, Khalil. 2009. Remarques comparatives sur le consonantisme entre le bidiya et le dangaléat. Lingua Posnaniensis, vol. LI/2009, 7–18. The Poznan Society for the Advancement of the Arts and Sciences.
 Alio, Khalil, and Jungraithmayr. 1989. Lexique Bidiya. Frankfurt-am-Main: Klostermann.
 Bagwell, Rosalind, Stephen Bagwell, and David Faris. 1992. Enquête sociolinguistique de la langue bidiyo de la prefecture du Guera, Tchad. N'Djaména: Association SIL. Manuscript
 Baldi, Sergio. 2004. Arabic loans in Bidiya. Studi Magrebini NS 2:71–87.
 Fédry, Jacques. 1977. Aperçu sur la phonologie et la tonologie de quatre langues du groupe "Mubi-Karbo" (Guéra): dangaléat est, dangaléat ouest, bidiyo, dyongor. In: Jean-Pierre Caprile (ed.), Études phonologiques tchadiennes, 87–112. Paris: Société des Etudes Linguistiques et Anthropologiques de France (SELAF).
 Hutchinson, Noelle, and Eric Johnson. 2006. A sociolinguistic survey of the Ubi language of Chad. SIL Electronic Survey Reports 2006-002. Dallas: SIL International. Online. URL: https://sil.org/silesr/abstract.asp?ref=2006-002.
 Jungraithmayr, Herrmann. 1991. Essai sur la subordination en Bidiya et en Mubi. In: Herrmann Jungraithmayr and Henry Tourneux (eds.), Études tchadiques: la phrase complexe, 9–13. Paris: Geuthner.
 Jungraithmayr, Herrmann. 2005. Prefix and suffix conjugation in Chadic. In: Pelio Fronzaroli and Paolo Marrassini (eds.), Proceedings of the 10th Meeting of Hamito-Semitic (Afroasiatic) Linguistics, 411–419. Florence: Dipartimento di Linguistica, Università di Firenze.
 Takács, Gábor. 2009. Dangla-Migama and Afro-Asiatic II: Bidiya c- and ǯ-. Lingua Posnaniensis vol. LI/2009, 119–124. Warsaw: Versita.
 Voigt, Rainer M. 1988. Das Bidiya – eine neue osttschadische Sprache. Anthropos 83:554–557.

East Chadic languages
Languages of Chad